Breux is a commune in the Meuse department in Grand Est in northeastern France.

Population

See also 
 Communes of the Meuse department

References

Communes of Meuse (department)